Leiognathidae, the ponyfishes, slipmouths or slimys / slimies, are a small family of fishes in the order Perciformes. They inhabit marine and brackish waters in the Indian and West Pacific Oceans. They can be used in the preparation of bagoong.

Characteristics
Ponyfishes are small and laterally compressed in shape, with a bland, silvery colouration. They are distinguished by highly extensible mouths, and the presence of a mechanism for locking the spines in the dorsal and anal fins. They also possess a highly integrated light organ in their throats that houses symbiotic bioluminescent bacteria that project light through the animal's underside. Typically, the harbored bacterium is only Photobacterium leiognathi, but in the two ponyfish species Photopectoralis panayensis and Photopectoralis bindus, Photobacterium mandapamensis is also present. Two of the most widely studied uses for luminescence in ponyfish are camouflage by ventral counterillumination and species-specific sexual dimorphism.

Although ponyfish seem quite ordinary and morphologically similar, their light organ systems are highly variable across species and often between sexes.

Taxonomy
Leiognathidae is classified within the suborder Percoideiby the 5th edition of Fishes of the World, but they are placed in an unnamed clade which sits outside the superfamily Percoidea. This clade contains 7 families which appear to have some relationship to Acanthuroidei, Monodactylidae, and Priacanthidae. Other authorities have paced the family in the order Chaetodontiformes alongside the family Chaetodontidae.

Timeline of genera

Genera
The following genera are classified within the Leiognathidae: 

 Aurigequula Fowler, 1918
 Equulites Fowler, 1904
 Eubleekeria Fowler, 1904
 Gazza Rüppell, 1835
 Karalla Chakrabarty & Sparks, 2008
 Leiognathus Lacepède, 1802
 Nuchequula Whitley, 1932
 Photolateralis Sparks & Chakrabarty, 2015
 Photopectoralis Sparks, Dunlap & Smith, 2005
 Secutor Gistel, 1848

References

 
Percoidei
Bioluminescent fish
Ray-finned fish families
Extant Eocene first appearances